Silence Yourself is the debut studio album by the English post-punk band Savages, released on 6 May 2013 on Matador Records and Pop Noire, a label owned by vocalist Jehnny Beth. It was nominated for the 2013 Mercury Prize.

Music and style
Critics made a parallel with British post-punk of the late 1970s, Magazine and Gang of Four. NME wrote that "French frontwoman Jehnny Beth has moulded herself into the demonic, possessed spawn of Ian Curtis and Siouxsie Sioux". Uncut retrospectively said about the music: "It is a bit Siouxsie, a bit Stranglers, a bit Magazine – and after a decade-odd of bands reviving the sounds and strategies of post-punk".

Reception and legacy

Silence Yourself received widespread critical acclaim upon its release. At Metacritic, which assigns a normalised rating out of 100 to reviews from mainstream critics, the album received an average score of 82, based on 36 reviews, indicating "universal acclaim".

In the United Kingdom, the album reached No. 19 on the charts.  In the United States, the album debuted at No. 70 on the Billboard 200, and No. 20 on the Rock Albums chart. The album has sold 43,000 copies in the US as of December 2015.

Retrospectively, Silence has continued to earn critical praise. In 2016, Treble placed it on their list of the 21st century's essential post-punk albums. In 2020, NME included Silence in their list of 15 "wildly influential" records in the post-punk genre. Noting Savages' "much-needed dose of self-mythology" they brought with them, they credited the band with sparking important questions about the perceived "bolshy [and] intimidating" nature of women in punk music. 

In 2019, Pitchfork ranked Silence Yourself at number 178 on their list of "The 200 Best Albums of the 2010s"; senior editor Stacey Anderson wrote: "Silence Yourself carries every bit of [Savages' live show] adrenaline; in its coiled, sparking guitars and rabid screams, it warns of the dangers of technology while weaponizing its potential."

Track listing

Personnel
All personnel credits adapted from Silence Yourselfs album notes.

Savages
Jehnny Beth – vocals, piano
Gemma Thompson – guitar, illustration
Ayse Hassan – bass
Fay Milton – drums

Additional musicians
Duke Garwood – clarinet (11)

Technical personnel
Johnny Hostile – production, mixing
Rodaidh McDonald – production, mixing
Mattia Sartori – assistant engineering
Mike Marsh – mastering

Design personnel
Antoine Carlier – design
Richard Dumas – photography

"Shut Up" samples Joan Blondell's dialogue from the 1977 John Cassavetes film Opening Night.

Chart positions

References

External links

2013 debut albums
Savages (band) albums
Matador Records albums
Albums produced by Rodaidh McDonald